Steve Callaghan is an American screenwriter, producer and voice actor, best known for his work on Family Guy. He is a graduate of the Department of Public Policy at the UCLA School of Public Affairs. Callaghan started his career in 1999 as a writers' assistant for Family Guy, and has since worked as a writer and producer on a variety of televisions shows such as 3 South, Yes, Dear and American Dad!.

Callaghan was offered a job as a writers' assistant on the animated series Family Guy in 1999, and became one of the first members of the original writing staff of the show. He served as co-executive producer during the show's fifth, sixth, and seventh seasons, and as executive producer during the show's eighth season. During the show's cancellation from 2003 to 2005, Callaghan wrote for the CBS television sitcom Yes, Dear and the animated television series 3 South on MTV.

In 2009, it was announced that Callaghan would begin serving as executive producer and showrunner for Family Guy and would oversee the show's transition to high definition, beginning in the ninth season and ending in the fifteenth season. Callaghan has authored two publications about the series, including Family Guy: Stewie's Guide to World Domination and a guide to the first three seasons of the show.

In 2013, in addition to his duties on Family Guy, Callaghan was also named executive producer and showrunner for the eighth season of American Dad!.

Callaghan continues as the current executive producer of Family Guy.

He has twice been nominated for a Primetime Emmy Award (including a nomination for Outstanding Comedy Series in 2009).

References

External links 
 

American television writers
American male television writers
Living people
UCLA Luskin School of Public Affairs alumni
Place of birth missing (living people)
Year of birth missing (living people)